Gregory Scott Gaines (born October 16, 1958 in Martinsville, Virginia) is a former professional American football player who played linebacker for eight seasons for the Seattle Seahawks.

1958 births
Living people
People from Martinsville, Virginia
American football linebackers
Tennessee Volunteers football players
Seattle Seahawks players
Los Angeles Rams coaches